Formestane, formerly sold under the brand name Lentaron among others, is a steroidal, selective aromatase inhibitor which is used in the treatment of estrogen receptor-positive breast cancer in postmenopausal women. The drug is not active orally, and was available only as an intramuscular depot injection. Formestane was not approved by the United States FDA and the injectable form that was used in Europe in the past has been withdrawn from the market.   Formestane is an analogue of androstenedione.

Formestane is often used to suppress the production of estrogens from anabolic steroids or prohormones. It also acts as a prohormone to 4-hydroxytestosterone, an active steroid which displays weak androgenic activity in addition to acting as a weak aromatase inhibitor.

References

Enols
Androgens and anabolic steroids
Androstanes
Aromatase inhibitors
Diketones
Hormonal antineoplastic drugs
World Anti-Doping Agency prohibited substances
Cyclohexenols
Enones